Torkampur (also Romanized as Torkampūr; also known as Torkambūr) is a village in Mehranrud-e Markazi Rural District, in the Central District of Bostanabad County, East Azerbaijan Province, Iran. At the 2006 census, its population was 408, in 90 families.

References 

Populated places in Bostanabad County